The  is a tram line operated by Toyama Chihō Railway in the city of Toyama, the capital of Toyama Prefecture.

The line is regarded as the first fully converted or constructed "light rail transit" (LRT) in Japan. Whilst other Japanese "LRTs" involve light rail rolling stock operating on original infrastructure, the "Portram" utilises new rolling stock on fully renovated infrastructure.

It has an official nickname "Portram'", after "port" (Toyama Port) and "tram".

Description
Also see the route diagram.
Distance: 7.85 km
Toyama-Eki – Okudachūgakkō-mae
under Tram Act, 1.35 km
Okudachūgakkōmae – Iwasehama
under Railway Business Act: 6.5 km
Stations: 14
Track: single
Doubling is planned at a short section of Okudachūgakkō-mae – east of Hatta bridge
Railway signalling: automatic
Depot: at Jōgawara

History
The Toyamakō Line was built as a heavy railway line by the private  in 1924; it was electrified with 600 V DC overhead catenary. The line was nationalized in June 1943 by Imperial Japanese Government Railways due to line's importance as a freight and materiel route to the port of Toyama.

The Japanese National Railways (JNR) modified the Toyamakō Line's electrification system to 1500 V DC, the last to be altered among JNR lines acquired from private companies. When JNR was privatized in 1987, the line became part of the West Japan Railway Company (JR West) network. During the time JR West operated the Toyamakō Line (which ended on 28 February 2006) it suffered a long period of declining passengers and the resulting reduction in service. The Toyama Light Rail Company, a public-private partnership with the Hokuriku Electric Power Company, Intec, and the municipal and prefectural governments as major shareholders, was set up to own and operate the line. It was modified for light rail services and reopened on April 29, 2006, returning it to service under a Toyama-based company after half a century of outside management.

Prior to the line's transfer in 2006, patronage was 1,700 passengers on weekdays and fewer than 750 on weekends. Under Toyama Light Rail ownership, the line proved to be surprisingly successful: 12,750 people rode the line on the first day. By November 9, 2006, one million passengers had used the line.

Since March 21, 2020, with the completion of a north south tram link across Toyama Railway Station, Portram services through operate into the Toyama City Tram system.

Services
Approximately six services are operated in each direction per hour in the morning, 4 in the daytime to evening, 2 in the late night. Services typically through operate into the Toyama City Tram system.

The fare is JPY 200 for an adult, 100 for a child per ride, reduced to 160 for an adult and 80 for a child when using the Passca, a smart card ticketing system. Citizens of the city of Toyama over 65 years old are entitled to pay JPY 100 per ride in the daytime with the "Silver Passca".

"Feeder bus" services are provided at Hasumachi and Jōgawara.

Rolling stock
Nicknamed "Portram", differently coloured 7 formations of TLR0600 type manufactured by Niigata Transys using Bombardier Transportation design, engineering, and technology, were introduced to the line.

Former

 72 series (from 1967 until 1985)
 457/471/475 series (from 1985 until 2006)
 413 series (until 2005)

Stations
All stations are in the city of Toyama, Toyama Prefecture. For distances and connections, see the route diagram.

The naming rights of two stations were sold (shown by *), of four which were on sale.
C15  (富山駅)
C26 (オークスカナルパークホテル富山前停留場)
C27 * (インテック本社前駅)
C28 (龍谷富山高校前（永楽町）停留場)
C29  (奥田中学校前駅)
C30  (下奥井駅)
C31  (Ōsakaya-Shop-mae)* (粟島 (大阪屋ショップ前) 駅)
C32  (越中中島駅)
C33  (城川原駅)
C34  (犬島新町)
C35  (蓮町（馬場記念公園前）駅)
C36  (萩浦小学校前駅)
C37  (東岩瀬駅)
C38  (競輪場前駅)
C39  (岩瀬浜駅)

See also
List of light-rail transit systems
List of railway lines in Japan

References

External links
  

Railway lines in Japan
Tram transport in Japan
Toyama (city)
Railway lines opened in 1924
Rail transport in Toyama Prefecture
1067 mm gauge railways in Japan
Japanese third-sector railway lines
600 V DC railway electrification